Ahmadabad (also Romanized as Aḩmadābād; also known as Deh-e ‘Ābedīn) is a village in Kavir Rural District, Deyhuk District, Tabas County, South Khorasan Province, Iran. At the 2006 census, its population was 29, in 10 families.

References 

Populated places in Tabas County